Dulcería Castañeda, is a traditional company and brand of candy in the Peruvian city of Trujillo. Since year 1925 traditionally this company made several kind of candies called alfajors and specially that giant candy called "Alfajor king kong" before known as Alfajor de Trujillo, "Dulcería Castañeda" currently has several local in Trujillo also in Lima city. Its main products are the alfajores requested by tourists as classic sweet souvenirs of the city of the everlasting spring. According to a study published in 2010 by the magazine Peru Económico this is one of the top ten brand of the city.

Related Companies
Caja Trujillo
Municipality of Trujillo

See also

Historic Centre of Trujillo
Chan Chan
Huanchaco
Puerto Chicama
Chimu
Pacasmayo beach
Plaza de Armas of Trujillo
Moche
Víctor Larco Herrera District
Vista Alegre
Buenos Aires
Las Delicias beach
Independence of Trujillo
Wall of Trujillo
Santiago de Huamán
Lake Conache
Marinera Festival
Trujillo Spring Festival
Wetlands of Huanchaco
Association of Breeders and Owners of Paso Horses in La Libertad
Salaverry beach
Puerto Morín
Virú culture
Marcahuamachuco
Wiracochapampa

External links

Map of Trujillo (Wikimapia)
"Huaca de la luna and Huaca del sol"
"Huacas del Sol y de la Luna Archaeological Complex", Official Website
Information on El Brujo Archaeological Complex
Chan Chan World Heritage Site, UNESCO
Chan Chan conservation project
Website about Trujillo, Reviews, Events, Business Directory
Municipality of Trujillo

Multimedia
 
 
 
 Gallery pictures of Trujillo by Panoramio, Includes Geographical information by various authors
Colonial Trujillo photos

References

Companies based in Trujillo, Peru
Brands of Trujillo, Peru